Remazol Brilliant Blue R (RBBR) is an anthraquinone dye used in textile industries. It is a harmful dye and can damage aquatic life and also vegetative life if the contaminated water is used for irrigation. Recent studies have suggested a biological approach to solving this problem through the use of microorganisms to degrade the dye.

References

External links
 

Anthraquinone dyes